Lal Chand (born 19 July 1928) is an Indian long-distance runner. He competed in the marathon at the 1960 Summer Olympics.

References

External links
 

1928 births
Possibly living people
Athletes (track and field) at the 1960 Summer Olympics
Indian male long-distance runners
Indian male marathon runners
Olympic athletes of India
Athletes from Gujarat